"Be Easy" is the first single by rapper Ghostface Killah from his critically acclaimed fifth solo album Fishscale. Initially released through mixtapes, it features Ghostface's Theodore Unit protégé Trife da God. The song contains a sample of "Stay Away From Me" as performed by The Sylvers. It was later included within the soundtrack to the action-drama film Waist Deep.

Track listings

A Side
"Be Easy" (Radio)
"Be Easy" (LP)
"Be Easy" (Instrumental)

B Side
"Be Easy" (Radio)
"Be Easy" (LP)
"Be Easy" (Instrumental)

Remix
"Be Easy" (Remix) 
"Future Thug" 
"NY Wildstyle" (Remix) 
"NY Wildstyle"
"Kilo"

References

2005 singles
2005 songs
Ghostface Killah songs
Def Jam Recordings singles
Songs written by Leon Sylvers III
Songs written by Ghostface Killah
Songs written by Pete Rock